Michał Kędzierski (born 9 August 1994) is a Polish professional volleyball player. At the professional club level, he plays for Asseco Resovia.

Career

National team
He took part in the 1st edition of the 2015 European Games. In the same year, he won the European League bronze medal, after defeating Estonia in the 3rd place match (3–0).

Honours

Universiade
 2019  Summer Universiade

External links

 
 Player profile at LegaVolley.it 
 Player profile at PlusLiga.pl 
 Player profile at Volleybox.net

1994 births
Living people
People from Rzeszów
Polish men's volleyball players
European Games competitors for Poland
Volleyball players at the 2015 European Games
Universiade medalists in volleyball
Universiade silver medalists for Poland
Medalists at the 2019 Summer Universiade
Polish expatriate sportspeople in Italy
Expatriate volleyball players in Italy
Resovia (volleyball) players
Czarni Radom players
Effector Kielce players
Setters (volleyball)